Sungai Dua is a state constituency in Penang, Malaysia, that has been represented in the Penang State Legislative Assembly.

The state constituency was first contested in 1974 and is mandated to return a single Assemblyman to the Penang State Legislative Assembly under the first-past-the-post voting system. , the State Assemblyman for Sungai Dua is Muhamad Yusoff Mohd Noor from Barisan Nasional (BN).

Definition

Polling districts 
According to the federal gazette issued on 30 March 2018, the Sungai Dua constituency is divided into 9 polling districts.

Demographics

History

Election results

References

Penang state constituencies